In immunology, clonal deletion is the removal through apoptosis of B cells and T cells that have expressed receptors for self before developing into fully immunocompetent lymphocytes. This prevents recognition and destruction of self host cells, making it a type of negative selection or central tolerance. Central tolerance prevents B and T lymphocytes from reacting to self. Thus, clonal deletion can help protect individuals against autoimmunity. Clonal deletion is thought to be the most common type of negative selection. It is one method of immune tolerance.

Discovery and function 

Frank Macfarlane Burnet proposed autoreactive cells would be terminated before maturation in order to prevent further proliferation in his study in 1959. There are millions of B and T cells inside the body, both created within the bone marrow and the latter matures in the thymus, hence the T. Each of these lymphocytes express specificity to a particular epitope, or the part of an antigen to which B cell and T cell receptors recognize and bind. There is a large diversity of epitopes recognized and, as a result, it is possible for some B and T lymphocytes to develop with the ability to recognize self. B and T cells are presented with self antigen after developing receptors while they are still in the primary lymphoid organs. Those cells that demonstrate a high affinity for this self antigen are often subsequently deleted so they cannot create progeny, which helps protect the host against autoimmunity. Thus, the host develops a tolerance for this antigen, or a self tolerance.

Location 
B and T lymphocytes are tested for their affinity for self MHC/peptide complexes before leaving the primary lymphoid organs and entering into the periphery. If they demonstrate high affinity for self-antigen, one method of preventing autoimmunity is through clonal deletion. This is where the lymphocyte would receive apoptotic signals from antigen-presenting cell (APCs). It is important to note that not all lymphocytes expressing high affinity for self-antigen undergo clonal deletion. B lymphocytes can also participate in light chain receptor editing, VH gene replacement, or be released and later undergo negative selection in the periphery. T lymphocytes can instead undergo clonal arrest, clonal anergy, and clonal editing. If autoreactive cells escape clonal deletion in either the thymus or the bone marrow, there are mechanisms in the periphery involving T regulatory cells to prevent the host from obtaining an autoimmune disease. However, for both B and T cells in the primary lymphoid organs, clonal deletion is the most common form of negative selection.

B cells 
B cells demonstrating high affinity for self antigen can undergo clonal deletion within the bone marrow. This occurs after the functional B-cell receptor (BCR) is assembled. It is possible for B cells with high self affinity to go undeleted because they require activation signals and stimulation from autoreactive T cells. Such T cells are often removed via clonal deletion, leaving autoreactive B cells unstimulated and unactivated. These B cells do not pose a threat, even in the periphery, because they cannot be activated without an autoreactive T cell to stimulate them.

T cells 
Between 2% and 5% of T cells develop auto-reactive receptors. Most of these undergo negative selection by clonal deletion.

Thymic cortex 
T cells that show a high affinity for self MHC/peptide complexes can undergo clonal deletion in the thymus. Thymic dendritic cells and macrophages appear to be responsible for the apoptotic signals sent to autoreactive T cells in the thymic cortex.

Thymic medulla 
T cells also have the opportunity to undergo clonal deletion within the thymic medulla if they express high affinity for self MHC/peptide complexes. Positive selection occurs in the thymic cortex, which suggests it is possible for a cell to undergo positive selection within the cortex and then negative selection in the medulla via clonal deletion. Epithelial cells are responsible for clonal deletion within the medulla. These medullary epithelial cells express an autoimmune regulator (AIRE) which allows these cells to present proteins specific to other parts of the body to T lymphocytes. This helps eliminate autoreactive T cells that recognize a protein from a specific body part.

Complete vs. incomplete clonal deletion 

Complete clonal deletion results in apoptosis of all B and T lymphocytes expressing high affinity for self antigen. Incomplete clonal deletion results in apoptosis of most autoreactive B and T lymphocytes. Complete clonal deletion can lead to opportunities for molecular mimicry, which has adverse effects for the host. Therefore, incomplete clonal deletion allows for a balance between the host’s ability to recognize foreign antigens and self antigens.

Methods of exploitation

Molecular mimicry 
Clonal deletion provides an incentive for microorganisms to develop epitopes similar to proteins found within the host. Because most autoresponsive cells undergo clonal deletion, this allows microorganisms with epitopes similar to host antigen to escape recognition and detection by T and B lymphocytes. However, if detected, this can lead to an autoimmune response because of the similarity of the epitopes on the microorganism and host antigen. Examples of this are seen in Streptococcus pyogenes and Borrelia burgdorferi. It is possible, but uncommon for molecular mimicry to lead to an autoimmune disease.

Superantigens 
Superantigens are composed of viral or bacterial proteins and can hijack the clonal deletion process when expressed in the thymus because they resemble the T-cell receptor (TCR) interaction with self MHC/peptides. Thus, through this process, superantigens can effectively prevent maturation of cognate T cells.

References

External links
 

Immunology